Kitano may refer to:

Takeshi Kitano, a Japanese film director and comedian
Kitano (Battle Royale), a Battle Royale character
Yukiko Kitano, a Battle Royale character
Kitano Tenman-gū, a shrine in Kyoto
Kitano-chō, a historical district in Kobe
Kitano (container ship), a Japanese container ship that caught fire on March 22, 2001
Kie Kitano, a Japanese actress
Hiroaki Kitano, Japanese scientist
, Japanese swimmer
, Japanese sport wrestler

See also
Kitano Station (disambiguation)

Japanese-language surnames